The Australian Oaks is an Australian Turf Club Group 1 Thoroughbred horse race for three year old fillies at set weights run over a distance of 2,400 metres at Randwick Racecourse, Sydney in the autumn during the ATC Championships series. The Australian Oaks is the premier staying race for three-year-old fillies during the Sydney autumn racing carnival.  Total prize money is A$1,000,000.

History
From inception in 1885 to 1894 this race was known as the AJC Oaks. The race was not held between 1895 and 1921, and when it was resumed it was known as the Adrian Knox Oaks Stakes until 1956. Since 1994 this race has been known as the AJC Australian Oaks and after the merger of the AJC and STC as the ATC Australian Oaks.

Between 1922 and 1945 the race was held in January.

Record time for the 2400 distance was set in 2006 by Serenade Rose with the time of 2:28.6 seconds.

Distance
 1885–1894 -  miles (~2400 metres)
 1922–1945 - 1 mile (~1600 metres)
 1946–1955 -  miles (~2000 metres)
 1956–1972 -  miles (~2400 metres)
 1973 onwards - 2400 metres

Winners

2022 - El Patroness
2021 - Hungry Heart
2020 - Colette
2019 - Verry Elleegant
2018 - Unforgotten
2017 - Bonneval
2016 - Sofia Rosa
2015 - Gust Of Wind
 2014 - Rising Romance
 2013 - Royal Descent
 2012 - Streama
 2011 - Absolutely
 2010 - Once Were Wild
 2009 - Daffodil
 2008 - Heavenly Glow
 2007 - Rena's Lady
 2006 - Serenade Rose
 2005 - Dizelle
 2004 - Wild Iris
 2003 - Sunday Joy
 2002 - Republic Lass
 2001 - Rose Archway
 2000 - Coco Cobanna
 1999 - Grand Archway
 1998 - On Air
 1997 - Danendri
 1996 - Kenbelle
 1995 - Circles Of Gold
 1994 - Alcove
 1993 - Mahaya
 1992 - My Brilliant Star
 1991 - Triscay
 1990 - Domino
 1989 - Research
 1988 - Savana City
 1987 - Bounding Away
 1986 - Just Now
 1985 - Our Sophia
 1984 - La Souvronne
 1983 - Starzaan
 1982 - Sheraco
 1981 - November Rain
 1980 - Lowan Star
 1979 - Valley Of Georgia
 1978 - Invade
 1977 - Surround
 1976 - How Now
 1975 - Sufficient
 1974 - Leilani
 1973 - Analie
 1972 - Gossiper
 1971 - Waikiki
 1970 - Gay Poss
 1969 - Flying Fable
 1968 - Lowland
 1967 - Farmer's Daughter
 1966 - Dual Quest
 1965 - Light Fingers
 1964 - Jane Hero
 1963 - Arctic Star
 1962 - Indian Summer
 1961 - Wenona Girl
 1960 - Pique
 1959 - Chicola
 1958 - Gay Satin
 1957 - Sandara
 1956 - Evening Peal
 1955 - Sabah
 1954 - Edelweiss
 1953 - Waterlady
 1952 - Wayside Bloom
 1951 - True Course
 1950 - Elusive
 1949 - Persist
 1948 - Jalna
 1947 - Sweet Chime
 1946 - Rose Bay
 1945 - Ribbon
 1944 - Flight    
 1943 - Flying Shuttle
 1942 - Whisper Low
 1941 - Session
 1940 - Climax
 1939 - Early Bird
 1938 - Sweet Myra
 1937 - Sal Volatile
 1936 - Cereza
 1935 - Limyris
 1934 - Leila Vale
 1933 - Roman Spear
 1932 - Gallantic
 1931 - Tantrum
 1930 - Gay Ballerina
 1929 - Loquacious
 1928 - Justify
 1927 - Persuasion
 1926 - Valicare
 1925 - Meenah
 1924 - Valdoona
 1923 - All Wheat
 1922 - Vodka
       1895–1921 race not held
 1894 - Acmena
 1893 - Bessie Macarthy
 1892 - Trieste
 1891 - Corvette
 1890 - Prelude
 1889 - Spice
 1888 - Pearlshell
 1887 - Lava
 1886 - †Tamarisk / Crossfire
 1885 - Uralla

† Dead heat

See also
 List of Australian Group races
 Group races

References

External links 
ATC Oaks (ATC)

Flat horse races for three-year-old fillies
Group 1 stakes races in Australia
Randwick Racecourse